Michael "Mike" McGeehan (born November 26, 1960) was a Democratic member of the Pennsylvania House of Representatives.

References

External links
Pennsylvania House of Representatives - Michael McGeehan (Democrat) official PA House website
Pennsylvania House Democratic Caucus - Michael McGeehan official Party website

Living people
Democratic Party members of the Pennsylvania House of Representatives
21st-century American politicians
1960 births